Cape Rouse is an ice-covered cape 8 nautical miles (15 km) east of Murray Monolith on the coast of Mac. Robertson Land. Discovered on 12 February 1931 by the British Australian New Zealand Antarctic Research Expedition (BANZARE) under Mawson, and named for Edgar J. Rouse of Sydney, who assisted the expedition with photographic equipment.

References

 

Headlands of Mac. Robertson Land